"La ballade de Michel" (meaning "Michael's Ballad") is Celine Dion's second single from the movie soundtrack Opération beurre de pinottes. It was released in 1985 in Quebec, Canada.

Background
"La ballade de Michel" was issued as a radio single only.

Dion also recorded an English version of this song called "Michael's Song".

The Peanut Butter Solution / Opération beurre de pinottes soundtrack album includes both versions as well as two other Dion recordings: "Dans la main d'un magicien" and its English-language counterpart "Listen to the Magic Man". Neither the French nor English version of the song was included on any of Dion's albums. The English version of "Michael's Song" has never been released on CD.

In November 2014, "La ballade de Michel" and "Michael's Song" were released digitally around the world.

Track listings and formats
Canadian promotional 7" single
"La ballade de Michel" – 3:00
"La ballade de Michel" – 3:00

Canadian promotional 7" single
"Michael's Song" – 3:00
"Message" – 0:08

References

1986 singles
1986 songs
Celine Dion songs
French-language songs
Songs written by Eddy Marnay
Songs written by Lewis Furey